Schipper is a Dutch occupational surname meaning skipper. People with this surname include:

 David Schipper (b. 1991), American soccer player
 Don Pepijn Schipper (b. 1980), Dutch DJ known as "Don Diablo"
 Esther Schipper, German art dealer
 Gary Schipper (b. 1952), Canadian neo-Nazi
 Geert Schipper (b. 1948), Dutch road cyclist
 Gerrit Schipper (1775–1832), Dutch portrait painter
 Hendrikje Schipper (1890-2005), oldest Dutch person
 Jakob Schipper (1842–1915), German-Austrian philologist
 Jan Jacobsz. Schipper (1616–1669), Dutch bookseller, printer, and theatre poet
 Jessicah Schipper (b. 1986), Australian swimmer
 Jos Schipper (b. 1951), Dutch road cyclist
 Katherine Schipper, American accounting researcher
 Kristofer Schipper (1934–2021), Dutch sinologist
 Lee Schipper (1947–2011), American physicist and energy efficiency expert
 Leo Schipper (1938–1984), Surinamese football coach and player
 Mineke Schipper (b. 1938),  Dutch author and literary theorist
 Ron Schipper (1928–2006), American college football coach
 Sebastian Schipper (b. 1968), German actor and movie director

In television
 Schipper naast Mathilde, a 1950s Flemish TV series.

See also
Schiffer
Schippers

Dutch-language surnames
Occupational surnames